Maeyama may refer to:

Maeyama Station, a railway station in Akita Prefecture, Japan
Maeyama Dam, a dam in Kagawa Prefecture, Japan

People with the surname
, Japanese footballer
, Japanese actor

Japanese-language surnames